Aichkirchen may refer to:

Aichkirchen, Austria, a municipality in Upper Austria, Austria
Aichkirchen, Germany, a village in Bavaria, Germany